Astrid Plessl (b. 1984) is an Austrian memory sports person. She is a national champion and Grand Master of Memory. She garnered international attention in the field in 2003 for scoring well across ten disciplines.

References 

Mnemonists
1984 births
Living people